For You is the fifth album by former Temptations vocalist Eddie Kendricks. Released in late 1974 on the Tamla imprint of Motown Records. It was arranged by Jimmie Haskell, Leonard Caston Jr., Jerry Long, Sanford Shire and Greg Poree.  
Jim Britt was the cover photographer.

Track listing

Side one
"Please Don't Go Away" (Leonard Caston)  4:57
"One Tear" (Leonard Caston)  4:00
"Shoeshine Boy" (Harry Booker, Linda Allen)  3:14
"Deep and Quiet Love" (Frank Wilson, Kathy Wakefield)  5:34

Side two
"Let Yourself Go" (Bradley "Mbaji" Ridgell, Harold Clayton, Leonard Caston, Sigidi)  5:45
"If" (David Gates)   3:09
"If You Think (You Can)" (Barbara Dickerson, Leonard Caston)  3:59
"Time in a Bottle" (Jim Croce)  2:59

Charts

Singles

References

External links
 Eddie Kendricks-For You at Discogs

1974 albums
Eddie Kendricks albums
Tamla Records albums
Albums produced by Frank Wilson (musician)